Kacl, KacL, or KACL may refer to:

 KACL (FM), a radio station (98.7 FM) licensed to serve Bismarck, North Dakota, United States
 KXLS, a radio station (95.7 FM) licensed to serve Lahoma, Oklahoma, United States, which held the call sign KACL in 1993
 KACL (Frasier), a fictional Seattle, Washington radio station on the TV series Frasier at 780 on the (AM) radio dial
 KacL, the name of several genes
 Václav Kacl (1910–?), Czechoslovak diver